Troublesome Creek is a stream in the U.S. state of Colorado. It is a tributary of the Colorado River.

Troublesome Creek was named for the fact soldiers had trouble crossing it.

See also
List of rivers of Colorado

References

Rivers of Grand County, Colorado
Rivers of Colorado